Alpha Beta Gamma is an international business honor society established in 1970 in Manchester, Connecticut, to recognize and encourage scholarship among two-year college students in business curricula.

Purpose
To confer distinction for high academic achievement in business studies; to encourage scholarship, intellectual development, and the pursuit of excellence in business careers; to teach leadership; to provide for an exchange of intellectual ideas; to provide networking opportunities for business students.

Requirements
To be eligible for membership in ABG, a student must be enrolled in a business curriculum in a junior, community, or technical college, or a two-year accredited program within a college or university.
The student must have completed 15 credit hours with at least 12 hours of his/her work taken in courses leading to a degree recognized by his/her institution. In addition, the student must have demonstrated academic excellence by attaining a 3.0 GPA or its equivalent in business courses as well as a 3.0 overall average.

Membership of Alpha Beta Gamma
Alpha Beta Gamma is a member of the Association of College Honor Societies and an affiliate member of both the American Association of Community Colleges (AACC) and the Association of Canadian Community Colleges (ACCC).

See also
 Alpha Kappa Psi , professional
 Delta Sigma Pi , professional
 Phi Gamma Nu , professional, originally women's
 Phi Chi Theta , professional, originally women's
 Epsilon Eta Phi , merged into 

 Beta Gamma Sigma , honor, (AACSB schools)
 Delta Mu Delta , honor, (ACBSP)
 Pi Omega Pi , honor, business education teachers
 Sigma Beta Delta , honor, (non-AACSB schools)

 Kappa Beta Delta , honor, (2-yr schools, (ACBSP)

 Association of College Honor Societies

References

External links
Official Website
 ACHS Alpha Beta Gamma entry

Association of College Honor Societies
Two-year college honor societies
Student organizations established in 1970
Business organizations based in the United States
1970 establishments in Connecticut